Madina Aknazarova (born February 15, 1998) is а Tajik pop singer of Pamiri origin, as well as a performer of traditional  Persian songs from both Tajikistan and Afghanistan.

Biography 
Madina Aknazarova was born on February 15, 1998, in the city of Khujand as the only child of parents from Badakhshan. When she was 4 years old, she and her parents left for Russia to the city of Saint Petersburg for a couple of years. Aknazarova attended school in the city of Chkalovsk, before her family left again for Saint Petersburg after completing the second grade. At school, music teachers immediately noticed her singing talent and unusual timbre of voice. She studied vocals in a school choir, and she always sung a solo part. Her parents divorced when she was still in elementary school.

In 2014, after finishing the 9th grade, her family moved to Dushanbe, where Aknazarova entered the Musical College named after Ahmad Boboqulov, the department of academic vocal. During her studies, she practiced at the Ayni Opera & Ballet Theatre.

Music career 
She began her musical career and continued her education at Tajik State Institute of Culture and Arts.

Aknazarova made her debut on the Tajik stage in 2017. An unusual timbre of voice, style of performance, good lyrics and energy helped to quickly find a response in the hearts of the audience. Aknazarova's fanbase grew rapidly both at concerts and on social networks.

The public liked the first album "Ay Yor Yor" (“Hey Sweetheart”), and very soon they began to invite her to various events, including concerts at the state level.

Discography

Albums

References

External links 
 
 
 

1998 births
Living people
Pamiri people
People from Khujand
Tajik-language singers
Persian-language singers
Tajikistani women singers
People from Saint Petersburg